William Dimmock (fl. 1406) was an English politician.

Family
Dimmock had a wife named Cecily and one son.

Career
He was a Member (MP) of the Parliament of England for Exeter in 1406.

References

14th-century births
15th-century deaths
English MPs 1406
Members of the Parliament of England (pre-1707) for Exeter